Theodoros Tripotseris (born 4 March 1986) is a Greek former professional footballer.

Career
Born in Athens, Tripotseris began playing football for local side Panathinaikos in 2004. Thereafter he played for Anorthosis, Levadiakos, AEL, Doxa Drama, Kavala and OFI Crete.

References

External links
 Larissa FC transfer announcement (Greek)
 Profile at Onsports.gr

1986 births
Living people
Greece under-21 international footballers
Greece youth international footballers
Greek expatriate footballers
Panathinaikos F.C. players
Anorthosis Famagusta F.C. players
Levadiakos F.C. players
Athlitiki Enosi Larissa F.C. players
Doxa Drama F.C. players
OFI Crete F.C. players
Kavala F.C. players
Expatriate footballers in Cyprus
Super League Greece players
Cypriot First Division players
Association football defenders
Footballers from Athens
Greek footballers